The Renoir Towers (Renoir Residences Height) are two residential towers currently under development in the Puerto Madero neighborhood of Buenos Aires, Argentina.

The Renoir One Tower is 136 m (446 ft) tall and has 41 floors and, upon completion, The Renoir Two Tower will be 175 m (574 ft) tall and have 51 floors. The complex was actually planned to be the tallest towers in Puerto Madero and Buenos Aires; but in 2007, work began on the Cavia Tower (from the Le Parc Figueroa Alcorta complex), which became the tallest skyscraper in the city upon completion in 2008.

DYPSA, the project's developers, modified the height of the Renoir Two building, extending it from 171m to 175 m, making the latter tower the tallest in the city upon its 2011 completion.

Third tower 
DYPSA had confirmed that a third tower would be built in a third lot acquired by the company. The third tower will be 136 m (446 ft) tall, and will have the same height as the Renoir I - but with a different design. The tower will be home to the Puerto Madero Renoir Alvear Palace Hotel, the second Alvear Palace Hotel in the city.

References

External links
Torres Renoir 

Buildings and structures in Buenos Aires
Twin towers
Residential skyscrapers in Argentina